Cosme Rivera Yucupicio (born 19 July 1976) is a Mexican professional boxer. He held the WBO–NABO light welterweight title in 1999, the WBC Continental Americas light welterweight title in 2002, the WBA Fedecentro & WBO Latino welterweight titles in 2006 and the WBC Latino light welterweight title in 2011. He also fought for a unified welterweight world title in 2005.

Career
Rivera initially played baseball in his native city of Huatabampo. He began boxing at the age of 15, sneaking out of the house to train at a local gymnasium. In his three years as an amateur, he only had nine bouts.

Rivera had a draw in his professional debut on January 1, 1993 vs. Cachorron Diaz.

Rivera got his first title fight on November 22, 1996 vs. Luis Alejandro Ugalde (7-0) in Tijuana, Mexico for the Baja California State Light Welterweight Title, winning by point in 12 rounds.

In 2003, he knocked out a previously undefeated James Hare in England.

References

External links
 

1976 births
Living people
Mexican male boxers
Light-welterweight boxers
Welterweight boxers
Boxers from Sonora
People from Huatabampo